The 1990 NASCAR Busch Series began February 17 and ended October 28. Chuck Bown of Hensley Motorsports won the championship.

Teams and drivers

Complete schedule

Limited schedule

Races

Goody's 300 

The Goody's 300 was held February 17 at Daytona International Speedway. Darrell Waltrip won the pole.

Top ten results

  3-Dale Earnhardt
  7-Harry Gant
 46-Greg Sacks*
 25-Jimmy Hensley
 41-Elton Sawyer
 44-Bobby Labonte
 58-Ernie Irvan
 87-Joe Nemechek
 32-Dale Jarrett
  2-L. D. Ottinger
Did not qualify: Randy MacDonald (#16), Rick Ware (#62), Billy Standridge (#47), Bobby Dotter (#08), Mike Porter (#35), Ben Hess (#9), Joe Thurman (#24), Rich Bickle (#00), Patty Moise (#45), Geoff Bodine (#01), Randy LaJoie (#71), Steve Park (#84).
The No. 46 car of Sacks was entered for in-race footage for the 1990 film Days of Thunder.

Pontiac 200 

The Pontiac 200 was held February 24 at Richmond International Raceway. Michael Waltrip won the pole.

Top ten results

 30-Michael Waltrip
  3-Dale Earnhardt
 44-Bobby Labonte
 32-Dale Jarrett
 36-Kenny Wallace
 63-Chuck Bown
 96-Tom Peck
  4-Elton Sawyer
  8-Bobby Hamilton
 99-Tommy Ellis
Did not qualify: Steve Grissom (#31), Frank Fleming (#33), Clifford Allison (#34).

Goodwrench 200 

The Goodwrench 200 was held March 3 at North Carolina Speedway. Harry Gant won the pole.

Top ten results

  3-Dale Earnhardt
 42-Kyle Petty
 36-Kenny Wallace
  7-Harry Gant
 58-Ernie Irvan
 99-Tommy Ellis
 32-Dale Jarrett
  1-Mark Martin 1 lap down
 44-Bobby Labonte 1 lap down
 25-Jimmy Hensley 1 lap down

Miller Classic 

The Miller Classic was a 200 lap race held March 11 at Martinsville Speedway. Tommy Ellis won the pole.

Top ten results

  6-Tommy Houston
 27-Elton Sawyer
 32-Dale Jarrett
 25-Jimmy Hensley
  8-Bobby Hamilton
 08-Bobby Dotter
 96-Tom Peck
 42-Todd Bodine
 99-Tommy Ellis
 63-Chuck Bown
Did not qualify: Jack Ingram (#11).

Mountain Dew 400 

The Mountain Dew 400 was held March 25 at Hickory Motor Speedway. Chuck Bown won the pole.

Top ten results

  6-Tommy Houston
 99-Tommy Ellis
 63-Chuck Bown
 59-Robert Pressley
 44-Bobby Labonte
 36-Kenny Wallace 1 lap down
 11-Jack Ingram 1 lap down
 31-Steve Grissom 1 lap down
  7-Harry Gant 1 lap down
 27-Elton Sawyer 2 laps down
Did not qualify: Clifford Allison (#34).

Pontiac 200 

The Pontiac 200 was held March 31 at Darlington Raceway. Kenny Wallace won the pole.

Top ten results

  7-Harry Gant
 44-Bobby Labonte
 52-Ken Schrader
  2-L. D. Ottinger
 25-Jimmy Hensley
 17-Darrell Waltrip
  6-Tommy Houston
 36-Kenny Wallace 1 lap down
 12-Jeff Burton 1 lap down
  4-Ed Berrier 1 lap down

Budweiser 250 

The Budweiser 250 was held April 7 at Bristol Motor Speedway. Bobby Labonte won the pole.

Top ten results

  2-L. D. Ottinger
 32-Dale Jarrett
 42-Kyle Petty
  1-Mark Martin
  3-Dale Earnhardt
 25-Jimmy Hensley 1 lap down
 96-Tom Peck 2 laps down
 44-Bobby Labonte 2 laps down
 87-Joe Nemechek 2 laps down
 63-Chuck Bown 2 laps down

 This race is best remembered for an infamous wreck involving Michael Waltrip. Waltrip's #30 Pontiac Grand Prix hit the wall at the crossover gate in turn 2.  The gate was not locked properly, so it opened, sending the #30 into the blunt end of the wall.  The car was literally ripped apart.  Miraculously, Waltrip emerged unscathed and competed in the Winston Cup Series' Valleydale Meats 500 the next day.

U-Can-Rent 200 

The U-Can-Rent 200 was held April 28 at Lanier National Speedway. Chuck Bown won the pole.

Top ten results

 63-Chuck Bown*
 36-Kenny Wallace
 99-Tommy Ellis
  8-Bobby Hamilton 1 lap down
 31-Steve Grissom 1 lap down
 79-Dave Rezendes 1 lap down
 44-Bobby Labonte 1 lap down
 08-Bobby Dotter 1 lap down
 25-Jimmy Hensley 1 lap down
 59-Robert Pressley 2 laps down

 Chuck Bown led all 200 laps in this race.

Roses Stores 200 

The Roses Stores 200 was held May 5 at South Boston Speedway. Jimmy Hensley won the pole.

Top ten results

 63-Chuck Bown
 12-Jeff Burton
 31-Steve Grissom
 25-Jimmy Hensley
 22-Rick Mast
  6-Tommy Houston
  8-Bobby Hamilton
 11-Jack Ingram
 59-Robert Pressley
 27-Elton Sawyer

Pontiac 300 

The Pontiac 300 was held May 12 at Nazareth Speedway. Davey Allison won the pole.

Top ten results

 25-Jimmy Hensley
 79-Dave Rezendes
 63-Chuck Bown
  9-Morgan Shepherd
 31-Steve Grissom
 26-Davey Johnson
 36-Kenny Wallace
  8-Bobby Hamilton
  6-Tommy Houston
 28-Davey Allison

Granger Select 200 

The Granger Select 200 was held May 19 at Hickory Motor Speedway. Chuck Bown won the pole.

Top ten results

 63-Chuck Bown
  6-Tommy Houston
 77-Jimmy Spencer
 59-Robert Pressley
 44-Bobby Labonte
  8-Bobby Hamilton
 31-Steve Grissom
 22-Rick Mast
  7-Harry Gant 1 lap down
 36-Kenny Wallace 1 lap down

Champion 300 

The Champion 300 was held May 26 at Charlotte Motor Speedway. Dick Trickle won the pole.

Top ten results

 32-Dale Jarrett
 92-Dick Trickle
  7-Harry Gant
 48-Sterling Marlin
 99-Tommy Ellis
 28-Davey Allison
 25-Jimmy Hensley
  3-Dale Earnhardt
 36-Kenny Wallace
 44-Bobby Labonte
Did not qualify: Jack Ingram (#11), Bobby Dotter (#08), Ward Burton (#9), Jeff McClure (#83), Ken Bouchard (#72), Jeff Berry (#61), Todd Taylor (#29), Ed Berrier (#4).

Budweiser 200 

The Budweiser 200 was held June 2 at Dover International Speedway. Bobby Labonte won the pole.

Top ten results

 30-Michael Waltrip
  7-Harry Gant
 44-Bobby Labonte
 96-Tom Peck
 56-Ronald Cooper
  6-Tommy Houston
 33-Dick Trickle
 63-Chuck Bown
 27-Elton Sawyer
 11-Jack Ingram
Did not qualify: Ed Berrier (#4), Dave Lind (#10), Dale Jarrett (#32), Kyle Petty (#42), Rick Carelli (#46), Mike McLaughlin (#51), Jimmy Spencer (#58), Randy LaJoie (#71), Dennis Curtis (#81), Stanley Smith (#94).

Roses Stores 200 

The Roses Stores 200 was held June 9 at Orange County Speedway. Jeff Burton won the pole.  The race was televised by SportsChannel.

Top ten results

 63-Chuck Bown
 79-Dave Rezendes
 11-Jack Ingram
  8-Bobby Hamilton
 12-Jeff Burton
 34-Jack Sprague
 42-Todd Bodine
 86-Dana Patten
 96-Tom Peck
 44-Bobby Labonte 1 lap down

 This race featured a thrilling race for the lead late in the event. Bown, Rezendes and Ingram were 3 wide for the lead with about 20 laps to go.

Firecracker 200 

The Firecracker 200 was held June 23 at Volusia County Speedway. Chuck Bown won the pole.

Top ten results

  6-Tommy Houston
 27-Elton Sawyer
  8-Bobby Hamilton
 31-Steve Grissom
 63-Chuck Bown
 87-Joe Nemechek
 11-Jack Ingram
 25-Jimmy Hensley
 08-Bobby Dotter
 79-Dave Rezendes

Carolina Pride/Budweiser 200 

The Carolina Pride/Budweiser 200 was held June 30 at Myrtle Beach Speedway. Tommy Ellis won the pole.

Top ten results

  1-Mark Martin
  2-L. D. Ottinger
 36-Kenny Wallace
 08-Bobby Dotter
 87-Joe Nemechek
 56-Dave Mader III
 99-Tommy Ellis
 96-Tom Peck -1 lap
 63-Chuck Bown -1 lap
 44-Bobby Labonte -1 lap

True Value Oxford 250 

The True Value Oxford 250 was a 250 green flag lap race held July 8 at Oxford Plains Speedway in Oxford, Maine. Joey Kourafas won the pole.

Top ten results

 63-Chuck Bown
  6-Tommy Houston
 01-Joey Kourafas
 22-Rick Mast
 79-Dave Rezendes 1 lap down
 41-Jamie Aube 1 lap down
 44-Bobby Labonte 1 lap down
 31-Steve Grissom 2 laps down
  7-Billy Clark 2 laps down
 15-Mike Rowe 3 laps down
Did not qualify: Wes Rosner (#4), Barney McRae (#5), Bob Brunell (#17), Davey Johnson (#26), Ed St. Angelo (#33), Patty Moise (#45), Mike McLaughlin (#51), Bruce Haley (#52), Mike Olsen (#61), Dean Chrystal (#65), Dave Smith (#84), Joe Nemechek (#87), Larry Caron (#88)

NOTE:  This is a joint Busch/Busch North series race. Under the rules of Oxford Plains Speedway for the Oxford 250, only green flag laps count towards the 250-lap distance.

Budweiser 300 

The inaugural Budweiser 300 was held July 15 at New Hampshire International Speedway.  The #25 of Jimmy Hensley won the pole.

Top ten results

 99-Tommy Ellis
  7-Harry Gant
 63-Chuck Bown
  9-Morgan Shepherd
 22-Rick Mast
 51-Mike McLaughlin
  3-Dale Earnhardt
 32-Dale Jarrett
 08-Bobby Dotter
 96-Tom Peck
Did not qualify: Joey Kourafas (#01), Joe Bessey (#09), Steve Park (#84), Mike Rowe (#15), Herb Simpson (#03), Jeff Barry (#23), Larry Brolsma (#18), Dave Davis (#21), Barney McRae (#5), Dale Shaw (#60), Ricky Miller (#06), Stub Fadden (#16), Gary Schwab (#89), Dave Lind (#0), Alan Strobridge (#6), Mike Weeden (#35), Bobby Gada (#36), Patty Moise (#45), Donny Ling Jr. (#66).
Bobby Labonte had flipped in this race when he was clipped hard,  got it upside down, hit the wall and tumbled 2 times.

Coors 200 

The Coors 200 was held July 21 at South Boston Speedway.  The #25 of Jimmy Hensley won the pole.

Top ten results

  6-Tommy Houston
 63-Chuck Bown
  8-Bobby Hamilton
 22-Rick Mast
 31-Steve Grissom
  9-Ward Burton 1 lap down
 99-Tommy Ellis 1 lap down
 44-Bobby Labonte 2 laps down
 21-Tommy Sigmon 2 laps down
 33-Ed Berrier 2 laps down

Granger Select 200 

The Granger Select 200 was held July 28 at New River Valley Speedway in Dublin, Virginia. Steve Grissom won the pole.

Top ten results

 31-Steve Grissom*
 63-Chuck Bown
 25-Jimmy Hensley
  6-Tommy Houston
 87-Joe Nemechek
 79-Dave Rezendes
  9-Ward Burton
 59-Robert Pressley
 36-Kenny Wallace
 35-Mike Porter

 This was Steve Grissom's first career Busch Grand National victory.

Kroger 200 

The Kroger 200 was held August 4 at Indianapolis Raceway Park. The #25 of Jimmy Hensley won the pole.

Top ten results

 31-Steve Grissom
 75-Ernie Irvan
  3-Dale Earnhardt
 63-Chuck Bown
 59-Robert Pressley
 27-Elton Sawyer
 96-Tom Peck
 33-Ed Berrier
 79-Dave Rezendes
 56-Dave Mader III

Texas Pete 200 

The Texas Pete 200 was held August 11 at Orange County Speedway. The #33 of Ed Berrier won the pole.

Top ten results

 63-Chuck Bown
  2-L. D. Ottinger
 59-Robert Pressley
 25-Jimmy Hensley
 27-Elton Sawyer
  8-Bobby Hamilton 1 lap down
 08-Bobby Dotter 1 lap down
 85-Bobby Moon 1 lap down
 99-Tommy Ellis 1 lap down
 22-Rick Mast 2 laps down

Jay Johnson 250 

The Jay Johnson 250 was held August 24 at Bristol Motor Speedway. The #44 of Bobby Labonte won the pole.

Top ten results

 22-Rick Mast
 32-Dale Jarrett
 31-Steve Grissom
 79-Dave Rezendes
  6-Tommy Houston
  1-Mark Martin
  8-Bobby Hamilton
 28-Davey Allison 1 lap down
 99-Tommy Ellis 1 lap down
 25-Jimmy Hensley 1 lap down
Did not qualify: Harry Gant (#7), Morgan Shepherd (#9), Jack Ingram (#11).

Gatorade 200 

The Gatorade 200 was held September 1 at Darlington Raceway. The #17 of Greg Sacks won the pole.

Top ten results

 32-Dale Jarrett
  7-Harry Gant
 30-Michael Waltrip
 42-Bobby Hillin Jr.
 25-Jimmy Hensley
  9-Morgan Shepherd
 28-Davey Allison
 56-Dave Mader III 1 lap down
 36-Kenny Wallace 1 lap down
 44-Bobby Labonte 1 lap down

Autolite 200 

The Autolite 200 was held September 8 at Richmond International Raceway. Michael Waltrip won the pole.

Top ten results

 22-Rick Mast
 31-Steve Grissom
 30-Michael Waltrip
  3-Dale Earnhardt
 25-Jimmy Hensley
 36-Kenny Wallace
 59-Robert Pressley
 32-Dale Jarrett
 96-Tom Peck
  7-Harry Gant

Ames/Splitfire 200 

The Ames/Splitfire 200 was held September 15 at Dover International Speedway. The #99 of Tommy Ellis won the pole.

Top ten results

  7-Harry Gant
 22-Rick Mast
 81-Todd Bodine
 32-Dale Jarrett
  8-Bobby Hamilton
 96-Tom Peck 1 lap down
 31-Steve Grissom 2 laps down
 36-Kenny Wallace 2 laps down
 56-Dave Mader III 2 laps down
 25-Jimmy Hensley 2 laps down

Zerex 150 

The Zerex 150 was held September 22 at Martinsville Speedway. The #22 of Rick Mast won the pole.

Top ten results

 12-Jeff Burton*
 59-Robert Pressley
 32-Dale Jarrett
 85-Bobby Moon
  2-L. D. Ottinger
 75-Jimmy Spencer
 25-Jimmy Hensley
 36-Kenny Wallace
 08-Bobby Dotter
 56-Dave Mader III

 This was Jeff Burton's first career Busch Grand National victory.

All Pro 300 

The All Pro 300 was held October 6 at Charlotte Motor Speedway.  The #63 of Chuck Bown won the pole.

Top ten results

 48-Sterling Marlin*
 15-Greg Sacks
 32-Dale Jarrett
  3-Dale Earnhardt
  8-Bobby Hamilton
  6-Tommy Houston
  9-Ward Burton
 56-Dave Mader III
 96-Tom Peck
 52-Ken Schrader

 This was Sterling Marlin's first career Busch Grand National victory.

NE Chevy 250 

The inaugural NE Chevy 250 was held October 14 at New Hampshire International Speedway. Ricky Craven won the pole.

Top ten results

 22-Rick Mast
 44-Bobby Labonte
 51-Mike McLaughlin
 25-Ricky Craven
 99-Tommy Ellis 1 lap down
 27-Elton Sawyer 1 lap down
 08-Bobby Dotter 1 lap down
 85-Bobby Moon 1 lap down
 12-Jeff Burton 1 lap down
 33-Ed Berrier 1 lap down

AC-Delco 200 

The AC-Delco 200 was held October 20 at North Carolina Speedway. Dave Mader III won the pole.

Top ten results

 31-Steve Grissom
  3-Dale Earnhardt
 97-Morgan Shepherd
  1-Mark Martin
 56-Dave Mader III
 28-Davey Allison
  7-Harry Gant 1 lap down
 99-Tommy Ellis 1 lap down
 32-Dale Jarrett 1 lap down
 42-Bobby Hillin Jr. 1 lap down
Did not qualify: Richard Lasater (#05), Rich Burgess (#37), Barry Bostick (#39), Jimmy Spencer (#75), Joe Nemechek (#87), Randy Baker (#88).
 This race marked the Busch Grand National debut of 19-year-old Jeff Gordon in the #67 Pontiac Grand Prix. Gordon qualified on the outside pole, but crashed out after 33 laps and finished 39th.

Winston Classic 

The Winston Classic was a 200 lap race held October 28 at Martinsville Speedway.  The #63 of Chuck Bown won the pole.

Top ten results

 31-Steve Grissom
  6-Tommy Houston
 96-Tom Peck
 51-Mike McLaughlin
 11-Jack Ingram
 40-Mike Wallace
 44-Bobby Labonte
  8-Bobby Hamilton
  2-L. D. Ottinger
 62-John Linville
Did not qualify: Mark Prestwood (#77), Jeff Gordon (#67), Doug Didero (#70).

Final points standings 

 63-Chuck Bown - 4372
 25-Jimmy Hensley - 4172
 31-Steve Grissom - 3982
 44-Bobby Labonte - 3977
 96-Tom Peck - 3868
 99-Tommy Ellis - 3829
 36-Kenny Wallace - 3829
  2-L. D. Ottinger - 3693
  6-Tommy Houston - 3667
 22-Rick Mast - 3617
  8-Bobby Hamilton - 3616
 59-Robert Pressley - 3504
 27-Elton Sawyer - 3442
 08-Bobby Dotter - 3351
 12-Jeff Burton - 3342
 79-Dave Rezendes - 3217
 87-Joe Nemechek - 3022
 11-Jack Ingram - 2902
 32-Dale Jarrett - 2473
 85-Bobby Moon - 2295
5/9-Ward Burton - 2271
 45-Patty Moise - 2190
  7-Harry Gant - 2134
 34-Jack Sprague - 2106
 86-Dana Patten - 2013
  3-Dale Earnhardt - 1947
 26-Davey Johnson - 1809
 33-Ed Berrier -  1748
 47-Billy Standridge - 1594
 56-Dave Mader III - 1432
  1-Mark Martin - 1321
 41-Jamie Aube - 1274
 30-Michael Waltrip - 1185
9/97-Morgan Shepherd - 1171
 42-Kyle Petty - 1079
 28-Davey Allison -  1018
 52-Ken Schrader - 1010
 14-Wayne Patterson - 955
81/42-Todd Bodine - 772
 21-Tommy Sigmon - 763
 49-Ed Ferree - 762
 75-Ernie Irvan - 742
 56-Ronald Cooper - 729
 98-Ron Lamell - 686
17/46/15-Greg Sacks - 654
77/75-Jimmy Spencer - 642
 51-Mike McLaughlin - 633
 48-Sterling Marlin - 625
 75/0-Brad Teague - 609
 17-Darrell Waltrip - 533

Full Drivers' Championship

(key) Bold – Pole position awarded by time. Italics – Pole position set by owner's points. * – Most laps led. ** - All laps led.

Rookie of the Year 
Joe Nemechek was named the 1990 NASCAR Busch Series Rookie of the Year, posting two top-five finishes and garnering a seventeenth-place points finish despite missing three races. The top runner-up was Bobby Moon, followed closely Ward Burton and Dana Patten, the only other candidates to try a full schedule. Among the other rookies in 1990 were Jack Sprague, Dave Mader III, and Clifford Allison.

See also
1990 NASCAR Winston Cup Series

NASCAR Xfinity Series seasons